Bruno Carlos Moura Gomes (born 29 September 1993) is a Portuguese footballer who plays as a defender or midfielder for Zimbru.

Career

In 2011, Moura moved to Luxembourg with his family and joined the youth academy of Racing Union Luxembourg after playing for Catujalense in the Portuguese lower leagues.

In 2019, he signed for Belgian seventh division club UCE Liège II after moving to the city to study engineering.

In 2020, he signed for Zimbru in Moldova after playing for Luxembourgish lower league team Lorentzweiler.

References

External links
 
 

Living people
1993 births
Portuguese footballers
Association football midfielders
Association football defenders
US Sandweiler players
FC Lorentzweiler players
FC Zimbru Chișinău players
Moldovan Super Liga players
Portuguese emigrants to Luxembourg
Portuguese expatriate footballers
Portuguese expatriate sportspeople in Belgium
Portuguese expatriate sportspeople in Luxembourg
Portuguese expatriate sportspeople in Moldova
Expatriate footballers in Belgium
Expatriate footballers in Luxembourg
Expatriate footballers in Moldova